In mathematics the Gould polynomials Gn(x; a,b) are polynomials introduced by H. W. Gould and named by Roman in 1984.
They are given by 

where
 so

References

Polynomials